Santería is a syncretic religion developed in Cuba between the 16th and 19th centuries.

Santeria may also refer to:

 "Santeria" (song), a song by American ska punk band Sublime
 Santeria (album), an album by Marracash and Guè Pequeno
 "Santeria" (Pusha T song), a song on the album Daytona by Pusha T

See also

 Santeros de Aguada, a Puerto Rican basketball team
 Santerians, a fictional superhero team